Michael von Abercron (born 17 November 1952) is an agricultural engineer and politician of the Christian Democratic Union (CDU) who served as a member of the Bundestag from 2017 to 2021.

Early life
Son of the landowner Friedrich-Karl von Abercron (1914–2002) and Huberta von Rodde (1919–2015), Abercron grew up on his parents' estate in Ostholstein, a district of Schleswig-Holstein. 

From 2005 until 2009, Abercron served as chief of staff to Christian von Boetticher, the State Minister of Agriculture and the Environment in the government of Minister-President of Schleswig-Holstein Peter Harry Carstensen.

Political career
Following the 2009 state elections, Abercron became a member of the Landtag of Schleswig-Holstein. In parliament, he served as his parliamentary group's spokesperson on environmental issues and data privacy. He was a member of the Committee on Internal and Legal Affairs and of the Committee of the Environment.

Abercron was elected to the Bundestag in the 2017 federal elections, succeeding Ole Schröder as the directly-elected representative for Pinneberg. He was a member of the Committee on Education, Research and Technology Assessment and of the Committee on Food and Agriculture.

Political positions
Ahead of the Christian Democrats’ leadership election in 2021, Abercron publicly endorsed Friedrich Merz to succeed Annegret Kramp-Karrenbauer as the party’s chair.

References 

Michael
Barons of Germany
Members of the Bundestag for Schleswig-Holstein
Living people
1952 births
Members of the Bundestag 2017–2021
Members of the Bundestag for the Christian Democratic Union of Germany